Ghelichkhani is an Iranian surname. Notable people with the surname include:

Alireza Ghelichkhani ( 1937–2018), Iranian wrestler 
Parviz Ghelichkhani (born 1945), Iranian football player

Persian-language surnames